Iksan station is on South Korea's high-speed KTX railway network, 243 km south of Yongsan station.

History
The station opened on January 1, 1915, and KTX trains on the Honam Line began services on April 1, 2004. The most notable incident to occur at this station was an explosion that occurred at 9:15 p.m. on November 11, 1977. The explosion occurred as dynamite being transported from Incheon to Gwangju caught alight. The station was then known as "Iri station" (이리역), Iri being Iksan's former name.

Services
Iksan station serves KTX trains on the Honam high-speed railway and the normal speed Honam Line. It also has express services and local services on the normal speed Honam Line. Trains on the Jeolla and Janghang Lines also call at this station.

See also
Transportation in South Korea
Korail
KTX
 Iri station explosion

References

External links
 Korea Train eXpress
 Route Map

Railway stations in North Jeolla Province
Railway stations opened in 1915
1915 establishments in Japan
Korea Train Express stations